Cupid is the god of love in Roman mythology.

Cupid(s) may also refer to:

Geography
 Cupid (moon), orbiting Uranus
 Cupids, Newfoundland and Labrador, Canada, a town

People
 Cupid (singer) (born 1982), stage name of Bryson Bernard
 Jonah Kūhiō Kalanianaʻole (1871–1922), a Hawaiian politician and aristocrat nicknamed "Prince Cupid"

Arts, entertainment, and media

Fictional characters
 Cupid (DC Comics), a fictional comic book character
 Cupid, one of Santa Claus's reindeer

Music

Albums
 Cupid (Cupid album), the self-titled debut album by Cupid
 Cupid?, a 2004 album by Canadian rock band Stabilo

Songs
 "Cupid" (112 song), a song by American R&B quartet 112
 "Cupid" (Sam Cooke song), covered by many artists
 "Cupid" (Lloyd song), a 2011 song by American R&B singer Lloyd
 "Cupid" (Daniel Powter song), a 2012 Daniel Powter song
 "Cupid", a song by Jack Johnson from On and On
 "Cupid", a 2015 song by Kara from In Love
 "Cupid", a 2015 song by Oh My Girl from Oh My Girl
 "Cupid", a 1998 song by Sara Evans from No Place That Far

Television
 Cupid (1998 TV series), starring Paula Marshall and Jeremy Piven
 Cupid, a 2003 dating reality show produced by Simon Cowell and FremantleMedia
 Cupid (2009 TV series), a remake of the 1998 TV series, starring Sarah Paulson and Bobby Cannavale

Other uses in arts, entertainment, and media
 Cupid (Michelangelo), one of two sculptures
 Cupid, a 2012 TV film starring Joely Fisher

Other uses
 CUORE Upgrade with Particle Identification (CUPID), a physics experiment
 Cupid plc, a British company that owns and operates dating websites
 Cupid (horse)

See also
 "Qpid", a 1991 episode of Star Trek: The Next Generation
 
 Cupid Day, a fictional day (on a Friday, February 12, repeating again and again) at Lauren Oliver's 2010 novel ''Before I Fall'